Ursula Jean McMinn (5 May 1906 – 21 April 1973), better known as Ursula Jeans, was an English film, stage, and television actress.

Biography
Jeans was born in Simla, British India, to English parents, and brought up and educated in London. She was the youngest of three siblings. Her brother Desmond Jeans was a boxer and actor, and her elder sister, Isabel, was also an actress. In 1931 she appeared in Edward Knoblock's Grand Hotel at the Adelphi Theatre.

Jeans made her stage debut in London in 1922, before joining the cast of the London production of The Play's the Thing, an adaptation of Ferenc Molnár's play, The Play at the Castle by P. G. Wodehouse. The cast included Gerald du Maurier, Ralph Nairn, Henry Daniell (before he went to Hollywood), and Henry Forbes-Robertson.  

She made her stage debut in New York in 1933. Her first marriage was to actor Robin Irvine (1931–1933, his death). Her second marriage was to actor Roger Livesey from 1937 until her death. (Livesey's sister Maggie was already married to Desmond Jeans.) She appeared in one film with Livesey, The Life and Death of Colonel Blimp (1943). She entertained troops with ENSA during World War II, sometimes working with her husband. After the war, she continued acting, including starring as Mrs. Tarlton, in one of the eight episodes of the BBC's 'H M Tennant's Globe Theatre', in 1956; and, in a stage tour of Australia and New Zealand, between 1956–1958.

Last years and death

Jeans made one appearance each, in Dixon of Dock Green, in 1967, as Mrs. Regan; in Theatre 625, as Mother Denis, '68; and as Ursula Benton, in  The Root of All Evil? (1968 TV series), also in '68.

She continued to act into the 1970s and died of cancer in 1973, aged 66, some 18 months after her diagnosis. 

She shares a memorial plaque with her second husband, Roger Livesey, in the actors' church St Paul's, Covent Garden.

Partial filmography

 A Gipsy Cavalier (1922) - Minor Role (uncredited)
 The Virgin Queen (1923) - Minor Role (uncredited)
 The Fake (1927) - Maid
 Quinneys (1927) - Mabel Dredge
 The Passing of Mr. Quin (1928) - Vera, the Maid
 S.O.S. (1928) - Lady Weir
 The Love Habit (1931) - Rose Pom Pom
 The Flying Fool (1931) - Morella Arlen
 The Crooked Lady (1932) - Joan Collinson
 Once Bitten (1932) - Clare
 The Barton Mystery (1932) - Ethel Standish
 Cavalcade (1933) - Fanny Bridges
 On Thin Ice (1933) - Lady Violet
 I Lived with You (1933) - Gladys Wallis
 Friday the Thirteenth (1933) - Eileen Jackson
 The Man in the Mirror (1936) - Veronica
 Dark Journey (1937) - Gertrude
 Storm in a Teacup (1937) - Lisbet Skirving
 Over the Moon (1939) - Millie
 The Life and Death of Colonel Blimp (1943) - Frau von Kalteneck
 Mr. Emmanuel (1944) - Frau Heinkes
 Gaiety George (1946) - Isobel Forbes
 The Woman in the Hall (1947) - Lorna Blake
 The Weaker Sex (1948) - Martha Dacre
 That Dangerous Age (1949) - Minor role
 Seven Women (1953) - Leonora - (Short)
 The Night My Number Came Up (1955) - Mrs. Robertson
 The Dam Busters (1955) - Mrs. Wallis
 North West Frontier (1959) - Lady Windham
 The Green Helmet (1961) - Mrs. Rafferty
 The Queen's Guards (1961) - Mrs. Fellowes
 A Question of Fact (1962) - Grace Smith
 Boy with a Flute (1964, Short)
 The Battle of the Villa Fiorita (1965) - Lady Anthea (final film role)

References

External links

 
 
  Performances listed on the Theatre Archive University of Bristol

1906 births
1973 deaths
English stage actresses
English film actresses
English silent film actresses
Actresses from London
Deaths from cancer in England
20th-century English actresses
British people in colonial India